Danny Clyburn Jr. (April 6, 1974 – February 7, 2012) was an outfielder for the Baltimore Orioles and Tampa Bay Devil Rays. He was traded from Baltimore to Tampa Bay prior to the  season for pitcher Jason Johnson.

Clyburn was drafted by the Pittsburgh Pirates in the second round of the 1992 amateur draft. He is the cousin of former Anaheim Angels pitcher Pep Harris.

Clyburn was shot dead in Lancaster, South Carolina on February 7, 2012. His killer was Derrick Lamont McIlwain, who confessed to the murder after witnesses stated they saw McIlwain and Clyburn arguing shortly before the shooting. On January 10, 2014, McIlwain pleaded guilty to voluntary manslaughter and was sentenced to 15 years in prison.

References

External links

1974 births
2012 deaths
2012 murders in the United States
Augusta Pirates players
Baltimore Orioles players
Baseball players from South Carolina
Bowie Baysox players
Deaths by firearm in South Carolina
Durham Bulls players
Gulf Coast Pirates players
High Desert Mavericks players
Major League Baseball left fielders
People from Lancaster, South Carolina
Newark Bears players
Deaths from bleeding
Rochester Red Wings players
Salem Buccaneers players
Tampa Bay Devil Rays players
Winston-Salem Warthogs players
Murdered African-American people
People murdered in South Carolina
African-American baseball players
20th-century African-American sportspeople
21st-century African-American sportspeople